William Manners Tollemache, Lord Huntingtower (19 May 1766 – 11 March 1833), known as Sir William Manners, Bt, between 1793 and 1821, was a British nobleman and Tory politician.

Background
Born William Manners, he was the eldest son of John Manners and Louisa Tollemache, 7th Countess of Dysart. On 12 January 1793, at the age of 26, he was created a Baronet, of Hanby Hall in the County of Lincoln. On his mother's succession to the earldom in 1821, he was styled Lord Huntingtower, and adopted the surname of Talmash or Tollemache.

Political career
Huntingtower was known for his high-handed manipulation of the Parliamentary vote in Ilchester in Somerset. He owned most of the borough, and represented it from 1803 to 1804 and 1806–1807. In 1818 his candidates, one of whom was his son, were not elected, and he had the workhouse pulled down. A petition to Parliament stated: 
Parliament offered no amelioration. In the severe winter of 1828–1829, he engaged in a large public relief project, hiring 528 workers in the vicinity of his estates in Buckminster in Leicestershire.

He served as High Sheriff of Leicestershire in 1809.

Family

On 12 January 1790, he married Catherine Rebecca Gray (d. 1852), by whom he had six sons and six daughters:
Hon. Louisa Tollemache (1791–1830), married Sir Joseph Burke, 11th Baronet and had issue
Lady Catherine Camilla Tollemache (1792–1863), married Sir George Sinclair, 2nd Baronet and had issue
Lady Emily Frances Tollemache (1793–1864), unmarried
Hon. Lionel Tollemache, 8th Earl of Dysart (1794–1878)
Hon. Felix Thomas Tollemache (1796–1843), married twice and had issue
Hon. Arthur Caesar Tollemache (1797–1848), married and had issue
Hon. Caroline Tollemache (1799–1825), unmarried
Lady Catherine Octavia Tollemache (1800–1878)
Hon. Hugh Francis Tollemache (1802–1890), married and had issue
Hon. Frederick James Tollemache (1804–1888), married twice and had issue
Hon. Algernon Gray Tollemache (1805–1892), married
Lady Laura Maria Tollemache (1807–1888), married James Grattan
Lionel's surviving siblings were granted precedence as the children of an earl on 6 November 1840.

He suffered a stroke at Buckminster Park on 7 March 1833 and died on the 11th.

References

Descendants of Sir Robert de Manners, of Etal

See also
 Public houses and inns in Grantham

1766 births
1833 deaths
Baronets in the Baronetage of Great Britain
British courtesy barons and lords of Parliament
Members of the Parliament of the United Kingdom for English constituencies
UK MPs 1802–1806
UK MPs 1806–1807
W
High Sheriffs of Leicestershire
Tory MPs (pre-1834)
Heirs apparent who never acceded
William Manners Tollemache, Lord Huntingtower